The 1915 Massillon Tigers football season  was their sixth season in existence, and their first season since 1907. The team posted a 5–2 record and obtained a share of the 1915 Ohio League Championship, with the Canton Bulldogs and the Youngstown Patricians.

Schedule

Game notes

References

Pro Football Archives: 1915 Massillon Tigers

Massillon Tigers seasons
1915 in sports in Ohio
Massillon Tigers